Joe Lawson is the name of:

Joe Lawson (writer) (born 1968), creator and writer of the GEICO Cavemen commercials
Joe Lawson (politician) (1893–1973), Australian politician
Joe Lawson (footballer) (born 1934), former Australian rules footballer

See also
Joseph Lawson (cricketer) (1893–1969), English cricketer
Joseph Lawson (trainer) (1881–1964), English racehorse trainer